Ameenah Kaplan (born June 17, 1974) is an American actress, musician, and choreographer.

Early life and education 
Kaplan was born on June 17, 1974, in Denver, Colorado. She was raised in Atlanta, where she graduated from Avondale High School for the Performing Arts. She also attended Tisch School of the Arts at New York University and trained in their experimental theater wing. She is a graduate of the Academy of Art University film school.

Career 
She has been a drummer since age 12 and was a member of the original American cast of STOMP. She is the west coast drum coach for Blue Man Group. She has played drums and/or percussion with Ty Taylor of Vintage Trouble, Adam Lambert, Alisan Porter, Macy Gray, Rihanna, Taylor Hicks, Lisa Haley and the Zydecats, Drake, Leslie Odom Jr., Scarlett Cherry, and the Twinz. She has performed on Oprah, Conan O’Brien, The Academy Awards, the AMA's, the Grammy's, and The Tonight Show.

She is the resident director of The Lion King on Broadway.

Filmography

Films

Television

Choreography

References

External links 
TV web
Bunkermedia
About the artists

American women comedians
Living people
21st-century American actresses
20th-century American actresses
American television actresses
American film actresses
American stage actresses
Tisch School of the Arts alumni
Actresses from Atlanta
1974 births
Academy of Art University alumni
Comedians from Colorado
21st-century American comedians